Naughty Girl , also released as Mam'zelle Pigalle, is a 1956 French CinemaScope musical film starring Brigitte Bardot.

Plot
Handsome cabaret entertainer Jean Clery  is engaged to his psychiatrist, Lili. He sings at a nightclub owned by Paul Latour which is being used as a front for a gang of forgers.

Paul has been framed and decides to go to Switzerland to find out who is really behind this. He has a daughter, Brigitte, who is at finishing school and thinks he is a shipbuilder. Paul asks Jean to retrieve Brigitte from school and look after her for a few days so she is not caught up in the police investigation.

Jean collects Brigitte pretending to be her uncle and keeps her at his apartment. While there, Brigitte causes chaos, upsetting Jean's butler, starting a fire, getting arrested for swearing and winding up in prison, and causing troubles with Jean's engagement to Lili.

Eventually Brigitte and Jean fall in love and the real crooks are caught.

Cast
Brigitte Bardot as Brigitte Latour
Jean Bretonnière as Jean Clery
Françoise Fabian as Lili Rocher-Villedieu
Raymond Bussières as Jérôme
Mischa Auer as Igor (ballet master)
Michel Serrault as 2nd Inspector
Jean Poiret as First Inspector
Jean Lefebvre as Jérôme's pal
Darry Cowl as Man with Suitcase
Bernard Lancret as Paul Latour
Marcel Charvey as Louis Dubrey
Lucien Raimbourg as Older inspector Dupuis
Robert Rollis as Gendarme

Production
According to Roger Vadim, producer Mr Senaumd had mostly made B movies. The producer had heard of a successful last minute rewrite Vadim did on Julietta and asked Vadim to perform a similar function on this film, which had been sold to Italy, but whose script star Jean Bretonniere did not like. Vadim agreed provided his then-wife Brigitte Bardot was cast as the female lead and if Michel Boisrond, René Clair's first assistant director, would direct. Vadim later wrote "for the first time, Brigitte played a character written for her, in modern language; and she had a classically trained director who was making his first film." He called the movie "a French equivalent of a Doris Day movie but with a bolder, more liberated edge."

Reception

Box office
The film was a box-office hit in France, being the 12th most popular movie of the year. It was slightly more popular than And God Created Woman which Vadim directed later that year.

Critical
The Observer wrote that the director "has learnt the knack of raising a simple laugh, not yet the art of touching heart and mind." The Los Angeles Times praised the "tight, high speed direction."

The New York Times wrote that the film:
Is full of slapstick and clumsy farce, and some oldish and splashy dance numbers. But it never piles up its effects in any one direction. Instead it keeps shifting key, from romance to melodrama to light comedy, back and forth. It presents nothing that can take the place of a serious study of Miss Bardot's form... The direction by Michael Boisrond seems rather fuzzy about whether or not Mam'zelle Pigalle should be a broad take-off on a Hollywood romantic melodrama. At the end, however, it seems this was the intention.

References

External links

 
review of movie at New York Times
Trailer of film at YouTube

1956 films
French musical comedy films
CinemaScope films
1950s French films
1956 musical comedy films